The 68th Grey Cup was played on November 23, 1980, before 54,661 fans at Exhibition Stadium in Toronto. The Edmonton Eskimos defeated the Hamilton Tiger-Cats 48–10 in one of the most lopsided victories in Grey Cup history.

Scoring
Edmonton Eskimos - 48
Touchdowns - Tom Scott (3); Jim Germany (2); Brian Kelly (1)
Field Goals - Dave Cutler (2)
Converts - Dave Cutler (6)

Hamilton Tiger-Cats - 10
Field Goals - Bernie Ruoff (3)
Single - Bernie Ruoff (1)

Trivia
Referee Don Barker called the game with four seconds remaining, as jubilant fans had by that point stormed the playing field.

Though Eskimo fans cherish this as Edmonton's most dominating triumph and their third consecutive of a record five straight Grey Cup victories, the 1980 game was hardly a classic; it remains one of the biggest blowouts in CFL championship history. The only larger margin of victory in a Grey Cup game came in 1923 in the 11th Grey Cup, when Queen's University blanked the Regina Rugby Club 54–0.

As of 2021, the 1980 game is the most recent Grey Cup in which one team did not score a touchdown. All the Tiger-Cats' points were scored by kicker Bernie Ruoff.

External links
 

Grey Cup
Grey Cup
Grey Cups hosted in Toronto
Hamilton Tiger-Cats
Edmonton Elks
1980 in Toronto
1980 in Canadian television
November 1980 sports events in Canada